Modern Ruin is the seventh studio album of Swedish futurepop band Covenant. It was released on 17 January 2011 by Synthetic Symphony. This was the first album by the band that featured Daniel Myer as a core member.

The second disc features various versions of "Wir Sind Die Nacht", a song the band recorded for the film of the same name.

Track listing

Personnel

Covenant
 Joakim Montelius – production (1, 3, 11, 12)
 Daniel Myer – production (4, 6, 8, 11)
 Eskil Simonsson – vocals, production (2, 3, 5, 7, 9–11, "Wir sind die Nacht")

Additional musicians
 Henrik Bäckström – vocals (2)
 Andreas Radler – machinedrum (10)

Technical personnel
 Oscar Holter – preproduction (2), production ("Wir sind die Nacht"), mastering ("Wir sind die Nacht")
 Mattias Möller – production (1), RSF Kobol expander (1)
 Björn Engelmann – mastering
 Ben Wolf – band photos
 Stefan Alt – other photographs
 Dirk Rudolph – logo, font
 Tobias Green – artwork, design

Charts

References 

2011 albums
Covenant (band) albums
Metropolis Records albums